The Tri-Series in Bangladesh in 2009 was a One Day International cricket tournament held in Bangladesh from January 10 to January 16, 2009. The tri-series involved the national teams of Bangladesh, Sri Lanka and Zimbabwe, with Sri Lanka winning the tournament.

Squads

Group stage

Points table

Matches

Final

References

2009 in Bangladeshi cricket
International cricket competitions in 2008–09
International cricket competitions in Bangladesh
2009 in Sri Lankan cricket
2009 in Zimbabwean cricket